Kenneth "Pete" Pettigrew (born 3 February 1942) is a retired United States Navy rear admiral.

Early life
He graduated from Stanford University in 1964 with a degree in biological science.

Military career
He began flight training in December 1964 and graduated in June 1966.

He was first assigned to VF-121, the United States Pacific Fleet Fleet Replacement Squadron for training on the F-4 Phantom II. He served a second combat tour from July 1968 to February 1969.

In April 1969, he returned to VF-121 as the senior landing signal officer (LSO). In early 1970 he joined the relatively new United States Navy Fighter Weapons School (TOPGUN) as an air-to-air and air-to-ground instructor.

In February 1972, he joined Carrier Air Wing Two aboard , as the wing's LSO. On 6 May 1972, while flying an F-4J of VF-114, he and his radar intercept officer Lieutenant (junior grade) Mike McCabe shot down a Vietnam People's Air Force MiG-21 with an AIM-9 Sidewinder.

He retired from active duty in August 1973, but remained in the United States Naval Reserve until January 1998. From January 1980 to January 1982 he served as commanding officer of VF-302.

Later career
Following his retirement from active duty he worked as a pilot for Pacific Southwest Airlines (later US Airways), retiring in 2002.

From 1983 to 1986 he served as a technical consultant for Paramount Pictures on the film Top Gun. He appears briefly in the film as Perry, a colleague of Kelly McGillis' character Charlie. His call-sign Viper was used in the film by Tom Skerritt's character Commander Mike "Viper" Metcalf.

References

American Vietnam War pilots
United States Navy personnel of the Vietnam War
United States Navy admirals
1942 births
Living people